Malaysia competed at the 2008 Asian Beach Games held in Bali, Indonesia from 18 October 2008 to 26 October 2008. Malaysia finished with 2 gold medals, 2 silver medals, and 6 bronze medals.

Medallists

References

Nations at the 2008 Asian Beach Games
2008
Asian Beach Games